The Breeders' 2017 tour consisted of twenty-one concerts in Europe and the United States. A date in Dublin was canceled due to Hurricane Orphelia. They opened for Arcade Fire at two of the dates. Compositions that the Breeders played on the tour included their 2017 single "Wait in the Car", the Pixies' "Gigantic", and songs by the Amps.

Performances and reception 
The Breeders began their 2017 tour with a "warm-up show" at the Southgate House Revival-Sanctuary music venue in Newport, Kentucky on October 10, with opening act Vacation. They then traveled to the United Kingdom for mid-October performances in Glasgow and Manchester, and an October 18 show in London. A concert in Dublin on October 16 was canceled because of Hurricane Orphelia. From October 22 to 27, the group played five concerts in mainland Europe, in Amsterdam, Antwerp, Berlin, Copenhagen, and Paris. For these and for the UK shows, the group PINS opened for them. The Breeders then returned to the US for end-of-month 40-minute sets supporting Arcade Fire in St. Paul and Chicago.

In early November, the Breeders performed with the group Flasher opening for them, in Detroit, Boston, and Washington, D.C., followed by dates in Philadelphia and New York City, with Vacation opening again. They then played the five shows on the West Coast between November 8 and 13, in Portland, Seattle, San Francisco (two shows), and Los Angeles; Melkbelly was the support band for this final leg of the tour.

The band played songs from throughout their career. From their first two albums, Pod (1990) and Last Splash (1993), they performed selections including "Fortunately Gone", "Happiness Is a Warm Gun", "No Aloha", "Invisible Man", and "Cannonball". They played "Off You" from Title TK (2002), as well as "Bang On" and "Night of Joy" from Mountain Battles (2008). From their then-forthcoming album All Nerve (2018), the Breeders performed "Archangels Thunderbird", "Walking with a Killer", and their 2017 single "Wait in the Car". Other compositions they played included songs Kim Deal's previous bands the Pixies ("Gigantic") and the Amps ("Pacer", "I Am Decided", and "Tipp City").

About their October 17 concert in Manchester, The Skinnys Joe Goggin wrote that "even as they’re settling slowly back into the saddle, the Breeders have lost little of their daring". Kitty Empire of The Guardian praised their performance of "Wait in the Car" on October 18 at the Electric Ballroom in London. A reviewer at the Indiepoprock website wrote that their performance at Trix in Antwerp on October 23 was charming. In St. Paul on October 29, Chris Riemenschneider of Star Tribune commented that the Breeders' performance "confirmed they’re still very much a contender"; City Pages Erik Thompson called their performance "endearingly shambolic" but stated it would have sounded better at a smaller venue rather than in a "slowly filling arena". The Vinyl District's Brigit Gallagher reported looking forward to the Breeders' upcoming 2018 album based on the "stellar" new songs the group performed at United Center in Chicago. Regarding this same show, Andy Argyrakis of National Rock Review said that the band "never once came across dated throughout 40 meaningful minutes".

Dates

Footnotes

References 

 
 
 
 
 
 
 
 
 
 
 
 
 
 
 
 
 

2017 concert tours
2017 in American music
Concert tours of Europe
Concert tours of the United States
November 2017 events in the United States
October 2017 events in Europe
October 2017 events in the United States
Tour 2017